In the Moment is an album by Gateway, a trio composed of John Abercrombie, Dave Holland and Jack DeJohnette. It was recorded in 1994 and released on the ECM label in 1996.

Reception 

The review at AllMusic states: "The collective trio Gateway has worked together on and off for three decades. They're sympathetically matched, with the five pieces on this album emerging from extended improvisations. The tonal range they embrace is dazzling, switching gears from Indian-flavored propulsion... to ethereal tone poems... Jack DeJohnette's ability to work equally well as a percussionist/drummer and pianist... benefits the group, and they make full use of the further possibilities offered. DeJohnette's work on the Turkish frame drum is extremely skilled and inventive, adding a key element to complement John Abercrombie's bent-note improvisations."

Tyran Grillo, writing for Between Sound and Space, commented: "DeJohnette chants through a Turkish frame drum for the start, Abercrombie working his microtonal magic with an ess-curved twang. This formula persists because it works, finding new purpose in 'Cinuçen.' Pregnant like a Saharan sky, it lets down its golden hair and lumbers through 'The Enchanted Forest' to catch up to its own jangling caravan. The interaction between bass and drums make tracks like 'Shrubberies' the beautiful things that they are. As far a cry as possible from the Monty Python images its title may evoke, this is an honest excursion that lowers us like a sleeping child into 'Soft.' For this, Holland draws his bow like the Loch Ness monster beneath Abercrombie's wavering reflections as a pianistic fog assures the sighting will never be captured. Magic and pure to the last, this one is."

The authors of The Penguin Guide to Jazz Recordings wrote: "In the Moment is supergroup playing of a high order, three hugely experienced musicians interacting without anxiety and with dazzling ease."

Track listing 
All compositions by John Abercrombie, Jack DeJohnette & Dave Holland
 "In the Moment" - 8:37  
 "The Enchanted Forest" - 9:23  
 "Cinucen" - 6:45  
 "Shrubberies" - 14:02  
 "Soft" - 7:09

Personnel 
 John Abercrombie – guitar
 Jack DeJohnette – drums, piano
 Dave Holland – bass

References 

1996 albums
Gateway (band) albums
ECM Records albums
Albums produced by Manfred Eicher